Mahal, meaning "a mansion or a palace", though it may also refer to "living quarters for a set of people". It is an Indian word which derives from the Persian word mahal, deriving from the Arabic word mahall which in turn is derived from ḥall ‘stopping place, abode’. A place of destination would therefore be referred to as "mahal anuzul". A place of recreation would be referred to as "mahal anunzul". The term máhal to refer to a place was also adopted in Hindi for example Panch Mahals and Jungle Mahals. The word developed its meaning for palace as in opposition to that of a jhopri or a "dilapidated house" as a neologism.

Both Muslim and Hindu rulers built many Mahals in India.

Notable mahals 
 Aina Mahal
 Hawa Mahal
 Hindola Mahal
 Jahangir Mahal
 Jahangiri Mahal named after Emperor Jahangir
 Jahaz Mahal
 Jal Mahal
 Lal Mahal
 Lalitha Mahal
 Noor Mahal
 Panch Mahal, Fatehpur Sikri
 Pari Mahal
 Prag Mahal
 Shah Jahani Mahal a part of the Agra Fort named after Emperor Shah Jahan
 Sheesh Mahal a palace used by the Imperial Mughal Family
 Taj Mahal, Agra
 Thirumalai Nayakkar Mahal
 Zafar Mahal

References 

Mughal architecture elements
Architecture in Iran
Islamic architecture
Urdu-language words and phrases
Rajput architecture
Royal residences
Bengali words and phrases